"Fire Woman" is a song by British rock band the Cult, written by singer Ian Astbury and guitarist Billy Duffy. It was the first single released from their fourth studio album, Sonic Temple, and was subsequently featured on all of the Cult's compilation/greatest hits albums, as well as being a steady fixture of the band's live performances.

"Fire Woman peaked at  2 on the US Billboard Modern Rock Tracks chart and No. 46 on the Billboard Hot 100. It also reached No. 1 on New Zealand's Recorded Music NZ (then RIANZ) chart and No. 15 on the UK Singles Chart. Two remixed versions of the song were released as B-sides or promos—the "LA Rock Mix" and the "NYC Rock Mix". Astbury claims the eponymous "fire woman" is a universal symbol, along the lines of a primary element.

Crush 40, best known for their contributions to Sega's Sonic the Hedgehog video game series, featured a cover of "Fire Woman" as the ninth track of their 2009 compilation album The Best of Crush 40 - Super Sonic Songs, and the tenth in their first live album Live!.

Track listings
UK 7-inch single
A Side: "Fire Woman"
B Side: "Automatic Blues"

UK 12-inch single
A Side: "Fire Woman", "Automatic Blues"
B Side: "Messing Up the Blues"
A Side: "Fire Woman (LA Rock Mix)"
B Side: "Fire Woman (NYC Rock Mix)"

Charts and certifications

Weekly charts

Year-end charts

Certifications

In popular culture
 The song been used during the closing credits of every Australian broadcast of the Formula One season since 2007.
 The song was used in the 2013 Doctor Who episode "Journey to the Centre of the TARDIS".
 The song, along with its video, was featured in the first episode of the second season of Beavis and Butt-Head.

References

1989 singles
1989 songs
Beggars Banquet Records singles
The Cult songs
Number-one singles in New Zealand
Song recordings produced by Bob Rock
Songs written by Billy Duffy
Songs written by Ian Astbury